
Gmina Brzyska is a rural gmina (administrative district) in Jasło County, Subcarpathian Voivodeship, in south-eastern Poland.

The gmina contains part of the protected area called Pasmo Brzanki Landscape Park.

Villages
Gmina Brzyska contains the villages and settlements of Błażkowa, Brzyska, Dąbrówka, Kłodawa, Lipnica Dolna, Ujazd and Wróblowa.

Neighbouring gminas
Gmina Brzyska is bordered by the town of Jasło and by the gminas of Brzostek, Jasło, Jodłowa, Kołaczyce, Nowy Żmigród, Skołyszyn and Szerzyny.

References
Polish official population figures 2006

Brzyska
Jasło County